Manawmye Football Club (also spelled Manawmyay) is a Burmese football club, based in Myitkyina, Myanmar. Founded in 2010, the club is competing in the 2010 season of the Myanmar National League.

Recent domestic league and cup history

Coaching and medical staff

Head Coach: Mr Fernando Sales
Goalkeeping Coach : U Han Min Htut
Coach: U Soe Moe Kyaw 
Team Manager: U Ohn Kyaing

Current squad

2015 First Team Squad

References

External links
 official website
 First Eleven Journal in Burmese
 Soccer Myanmar in Burmese

Association football clubs established in 2010
Myanmar National League clubs
2010 establishments in Myanmar
Football clubs in Myanmar